The 2006 Birganj unrest were several incidents of unrest perpetrated by Hindu groups in the Nepalese city of Birgunj on 22 May 2006 following the announcement  by the Parliament of Nepal on 18 May that the country will become a secular state. The declaration lead to widespread unrest by Hindu fundamentalist groups across Nepal - the town of Birgunj was forced to close for two days.

The unrest
Hindu organizations in Nepal viewed the declaration of secular Nepal as "defamatory" and "dangerous" and told that it could provoke a "religious crusade" in the country.

The town of Birgunj lies on the border with India and according to local journalists the people involved in the unrest in the town had the character of the Hindu nationalist rallies that take place in India. The town was closed down by an alliance of Hindu groups - with thousands taking to the streets.

References

Politics of Nepal
2006 in Nepal